The Puerto Rico American Football League (PRAFL) is a semi-pro American football league in Puerto Rico. The PRAFL is the highest level of competition in Puerto Rican American football league pyramid, a form of gridiron football closely related to American football. Its eight current teams, which are located in eight separate cities.

History

Puerto Rico American Football League was founded in 1984.

Clubs
The PRAFL consists of 8 clubs playing in a single conference.

Active Teams

Defunct Teams

Timeline of PRAFL teams

Season format

The PRAFL season format consists of a seven-week regular season (each team plays 7 games), and a four-team single-elimination playoff culminating in the league's championship game.

Regular season

Postseason

Trophies and awards

See also
 List of PRAFL champions
 List of PRAFL seasons

References

 
American football leagues